(from Tottori, Japan, born May 1, 1954) is a Japanese  ceramic artist known for white porcelain. He is a Living National Treasure of Japan and a member of the Japan Kōgei Association.

Maeta's style is achieved by hand-forming his works as opposed to forming them on a potter's wheel. He uses his fingers, palms, and a blade to perfect the shape of his white porcelain sculptures.

Awards and recognition
As a result of his work with ceramics, Maeta has won numerous awards including the Ceramic Society of Japan award in 2003. He is also acknowledged as a holder of important intangible cultural property for his work with white porcelain.

In 2007, he was awarded a Medal of Honour with purple ribbon by the government of Japan.

In 2013, he was recognized as a Living National Treasure of Japan.

Collections containing work
 British Museum, London, United Kingdom
 Tottori Prefectural Museum, Tottori Prefecture, Japan

References

External links
 Akihiro Maeta website

1954 births
Living National Treasures of Japan
Living people
20th-century Japanese people
21st-century Japanese people